Mercury chloride can refer to:
Mercury(II) chloride or mercuric chloride (HgCl2)
Mercury(I) chloride or mercurous chloride (Hg2Cl2)